Merillat Airport  is a public use airport located three nautical miles (6 km) southeast of the central business district of Tecumseh, in Lenawee County, Michigan, United States. It is owned by James N. Merillatt and managed by Jeff Wright. The airport opened in February 1976. "The Landing" banquet hall is adjacent to the airport on N. Rogers Rd.

Facilities and aircraft 
It has one runway designated 18/36 with a turf surface measuring 3,608 by 100 feet (1,100 x 30 m).

For the 12-month period ending December 31, 2006, the airport had 2,280 general aviation aircraft operations, an average of 190 per month. At that time there were 20 aircraft based at this airport: 90% single-engine, 5% multi-engine and 5% ultralight.

Gallery

References

External links 
 Tecumseh, Merillat (34G) airport diagram from Michigan DOT
 Aerial image as of 28 April 1992 from USGS The National Map

Airports in Michigan
Airports in Lenawee County, Michigan